Wing Ning Wai is a walled village in Lung Yeuk Tau, Fanling, Hong Kong. It is one of the Five Wai (walled villages) and Six Tsuen (villages) in Lung Yeuk Tau.

Administration
Wing Ning Wai, as part of Lung Yeuk Tau, is a recognized village under the New Territories Small House Policy. Wing Ning Wai is one of the villages represented within the Fanling District Rural Committee. For electoral purposes, Wing Ning Wai is part of the Queen's Hill constituency, which is currently represented by Law Ting-tak.

History
Wing Ning Wai is said to have a history dating back 400 to 500 years. It historically comprised three rows of houses enclosed within a rectangular protective wall, with an entrance gate in the north-east front wall and four watchtowers at its four corners. While the entrance gate, built in 1744, is still extant, the watchtowers and most of the enclosing walls have been demolished. Some of the watchtowers had new buildings constructed on them.

Wing Ning Tsuen
Wing Ning Tsuen, also known as Tai Tang, is a branch of Wing Ning Wai, and is located to its southeast. The village, which is about 300 years old, is one of the Six Tsuen (villages) in Lung Yeuk Tau.

Conservation
Wing Ning Wai and Wing Ning Tsuen are located along the Lung Yeuk Tau Heritage Trail. The entrance gate of Wing Ning Wai has been listed as a Grade III historic building.

See also
 Walled villages of Hong Kong
 Tang Clan

References

External links

 Delineation of area of existing village Lung Yeuk Tau (Fanling) for election of resident representative (2019 to 2022) (includes Wing Ning Wai)
 Antiquities and Monuments Office. Hong Kong Traditional Chinese Architectural Information System. Wing Ning Wai
 Antiquities Advisory Board. Pictures of Entrance Gate of Wing Ning Wai, Lung Yeuk Tau

Walled villages of Hong Kong
Lung Yeuk Tau
Villages in North District, Hong Kong